Lahiri is an Indian surname belonging to Bengali Brahmins. Notable people with this surname include:

 Anirban Lahiri (born 1987), Indian golfer
 Anya Lahiri (born 1982), British model
 Bappi Lahiri (1952-2022), Indian music director
 Dulal Lahiri (born 1947), Bengali actor
 Jhumpa Lahiri (born 1967), Indian-American author
 Rajendra Lahiri (1901–1927), Bengali revolutionary
 Samik Lahiri (born 1967), Indian politician
 Shanu Lahiri (1928–2013), Bengali painter
 Shyama Charan Lahiri (1828–1895), Indian yogi, better known as Lahiri Mahasaya

Indian surnames
Bengali Hindu surnames